True Story is an American drama limited series created by Eric Newman for Netflix. The series premiered on November 24, 2021, and consists of seven episodes.

Premise 
A tour stop in Philadelphia becomes a matter of life and death for one of the world's most famous comedians.

Cast and characters 
 Kevin Hart as Kid, a rising comedian
 Wesley Snipes as Carlton, Kid's older brother
 Tawny Newsome as Billie
 Paul Adelstein as Todd
 Will Catlett as Herschel
 Chris Diamantopoulos as Savvas
 Billy Zane as Ari
 Lauren London as Monyca
 Ash Santos as Daphne
 John Ales as Nikos
 Theo Rossi as Gene, a wildly excitable and enthusiastic superfan of Kid
Emmanuel Kabongo as Man (uncredited)

Additionally, Chris Hemsworth and Ellen DeGeneres make cameo appearances as themselves.

Episodes

Production

Development 
On December 9, 2020, it was announced that Kevin Hart and Wesley Snipes would star in the limited series True Story. The series is created and executive produced by Eric Newman. The series is the television drama debut for Hart, who also executive produces, along with showrunner Charles Murray, director Stephen Williams, and Dave Becky. Hartbeat Productions and Grand Electric produce the series. Caroline Currier, Mike Stein, and Tiffany Brown serve as co-producers.

Casting 
Alongside the series announcement, Kevin Hart and Wesley Snipes were cast. In February 2021, Tawny Newsome, Paul Adelstein, Will Catlett, Chris Diamantopoulos, Billy Zane, Lauren London, Ash Santos, and John Ales were cast. Theo Rossi was cast a month later.

Filming 
Filming was set to begin in late January 2021.

Reception
The review aggregator website Rotten Tomatoes reported a 57% approval rating with an average rating of 5.9/10, based on 20 critic reviews. The website's critics consensus reads, "Kevin Hart and Wesley Snipes make for a compelling duo, but True Story muffles their chemistry with a dawdling, unmemorable plot." Metacritic gave the series a weighted average score of 54 out of 100 based on 11 critics, indicating "mixed or average reviews".

References

External links
 
 

2021 American television series debuts
2021 American television series endings
2020s American drama television miniseries
2020s American crime drama television series
English-language Netflix original programming
Television series about comedians